{| class="infobox" style="width: 25em; text-align: left; font-size: 90%; vertical-align: middle;"
|+ <span style="font-size: 9pt">List of accolades received by the Alien film series</span>
|-
| colspan="3" style="text-align:center;" |
Sigourney Weaver has been critically lauded for her portrayal of Ellen Ripley in the Alien film series and has been nominated for both Academy and Golden Globe Awards for her performance in Aliens. Her success is considered as a milestone of the recognition to the science fiction and horror genres.
|-
| colspan=3 |

|- bgcolor="#ccccff"
|align="center" colspan="3"|
Total number of wins and nominations
|-
|
|
|
|- bgcolor="#ccccff"
| colspan="3" style="font-size: smaller; text-align:center;" | Footnotes
|}Alien is an action/horror film series created by Dan O'Bannon and Ronald Shusett. The series began with the four films Alien (1979), Aliens (1986), Alien 3 (1992), and Alien Resurrection (1997). A prequel series directed by Ridley Scott began with Prometheus (2012) and continued with Alien: Covenant (2017). Set between the 21st and 24th centuries, the plot focuses on humanity's violent encounters with a vicious alien life form, with the lead protagonist being Ellen Ripley, a woman determined to stop the creature and prevent the corrupt Weyland-Yutani Corporation from obtaining it for biological weaponry.

The first two installments in the film series were met with universal praise for the technical attributes, as well as Sigourney Weaver's portrayal of the lead, Ellen Ripley, for which she earned nine nominations and two wins (Saturn Award for Best Actress and Hasty Pudding Woman of the Year Award). Though the subsequent installments were met with generally mixed reviews, all five films in the Alien film series have been critically lauded for their technical attributes, ranging from recognition of the visual and sound effects, to the design of the recurring alien creature. The Alien Quadrilogy and Alien Anthology'' DVD and Blu-ray Disc collections have both won medium-specific awards.

Alien

Aliens 

 AFI's 100 Years... 100 Movie Quotes (2005)
 "Get away from her, you bitch!" – Nominated.

Alien 3

Alien Resurrection

Prometheus

Alien: Covenant

DVD and Blu-ray Disc re-issues

Alien Quadrilogy

Alien Anthology

See also 
 List of accolades received by the Predator film series

References

External links 

 
 
 
 
 
 

Accolades
Lists of accolades by film series
Alien (franchise) films
Horror film lists